Bryan Heath Evans (born December 30, 1978) is a former American football fullback and former analyst on NFL Network. After playing college football at Auburn he was drafted by the Seattle Seahawks in the third round of the 2001 NFL Draft. He also played for the Miami Dolphins, New England Patriots, and New Orleans Saints, the last of which he won a Super Bowl with while on injured reserve. Evans retired after the 2010 season and was formerly an analyst with NFL Network.

Early years
While attending The King's Academy in West Palm Beach, Evans lettered in football and basketball. In football, he was a two-time All-State selection as a tailback. During a game his junior year, Heath was once tackled in the backfield by Tom Segura.

College career
Evans attended Auburn University. In football, he finished his three-year career with 149 rushing attempts for 626 yards (4.2 yards per rush) and six touchdowns, and 30 receptions for 354 yards (11.8 yards per reception) and a touchdown.

Professional career

Seattle Seahawks
Evans was the first fullback taken in the 2001 NFL Draft, with the Seahawks selecting him in the third round (82nd overall). Evans spent four years in Seattle blocking for running back Shaun Alexander.

Miami Dolphins 
Evans signed with the Miami Dolphins in the spring of 2005. While in Miami, Evans was re-united with former Auburn tailback Ronnie Brown (with whom he was a teammate in 2000), but was cut six weeks into the season.

New England Patriots
One week later, the New England Patriots signed Evans for the remainder of the 2005 season. On November 16, he filled in for an injured Corey Dillon at tailback against his former team and rushed for 84 yards on 17 carries and caught 3 passes for 18 yards, subsequently leading the Patriots to victory. On March 23, 2006, the Patriots re-signed Evans as an unrestricted free agent to another one-year contract.

During the 2006 season, Evans ran for 117 yards on 27 carries. He also caught 7 passes for 34 yards. In week 5 against the Dolphins, Evans scored his first career touchdown on a 1-yard reception from Tom Brady. Two weeks later against the Minnesota Vikings, Evans recorded his career long carry of 35 yards. Against the San Diego Chargers in the playoffs, Evans recorded 3 special team tackles in the Patriots' 24-21 upset. Evans caught 4 passes in the AFC Championship loss to the Colts.

On February 24, 2007, the Patriots announced that Evans signed a two-year contract extension, keeping him off the free agent market. During the pre-season, in a Week 3 scrimmage against the Carolina Panthers, Evans rushed for 58 yards on 7 carries with 1 touchdown and caught 2 receptions for 19 yards and a score. His touchdown run was of 2 yards and his touchdown reception was of 8 yards. In total, he had 77 yards of total offense on 9 touches with 2 touchdowns.   Evans rushed for a 2-yard touchdown against the New York Jets in a 38-14 victory in the opening game of the 2007 season.

New Orleans Saints
An unrestricted free agent in the 2009 offseason, Evans was signed by the New Orleans Saints on March 5. Upon the signing, the team released incumbent fullback Mike Karney.  Evans played in the Saints' first six games (5 att, 16yds, 1 touchdown), but he suffered a season-ending knee injury in their October 25 game against the Miami Dolphins and was placed on the injured reserve list. While Evans was on injured reserve, the Saints went on to beat the Indianapolis Colts in Super Bowl XLIV, earning Evans his only Super Bowl ring.

Retirement
On August 24, 2011, Evans announced via Twitter that he had decided to retire from the NFL after 10 seasons, agreeing to a multi-year contract to become an analyst for the NFL Network.

Broadcasting career
Evans was an analyst on NFL Network and joined the NFL on Fox as a game analyst in 2012 with Sam Rosen.

On December 12, 2017, Evans, along with Marshall Faulk and Ike Taylor, was suspended from the NFL Network after sexual harassment accusations against them were made.

On August 9, 2018, Evans released a statement that he was fired from the NFL Network after refusing to sign a "silencing agreement."

Personal
Evans has two daughters, Ava and Naomi; they reside in Manhattan Beach, CA.

In September 2017, Evans launched an Athletic Performance Coaching and Fitness Apparel website.

He married Christine Carter on August 21, 2020.

References

External links

New England Patriots bio
New Orleans Saints bio 
NFL Network bio
Heath Evans Twitter
Heath Evans Instagram

1978 births
Living people
American football fullbacks
Auburn Tigers football players
Miami Dolphins players
National Football League announcers
New England Patriots players
New Orleans Saints players
Players of American football from Florida
Seattle Seahawks players
Sportspeople from West Palm Beach, Florida
Ed Block Courage Award recipients